Jack Browns Seaplane Base  is a public-use seaplane base located 3 nautical miles (5.56 km) northwest of the central business district of Winter Haven in Polk County, Florida, United States.  It is located on the northeast shore of Lake Jessie, which is part of the Winter Haven Chain of Lakes. The privately owned seaplane base is located adjacent to Winter Haven's Gilbert Airport and connected to it by an asphalt taxiway.

Facilities and aircraft 
It has one water runway: 1/19 is 3,600 by 2,200 feet (1,097 x 670.6 m).

For the 12-month period ending November 17, 2009, the airport had 10,000 general aviation aircraft operations, an average of 27 per day. At that time there were 5 aircraft based at this airport: 80% single-engine and 20% multi-engine.

Accidents 
On March 7, 2023, at 1900Z, two aircraft collided during training. All 4 people aboard both planes died.

References

External links
 

Airports in Polk County, Florida
Seaplane bases in the United States
Buildings and structures in Winter Haven, Florida
Privately owned airports